Camille is a unisex name.

History
The form Camille was later associated with the heroine of  Dumas' The Lady of the Camellias (1848), which served as the basis for Verdi's opera La Traviata and several films. In Dumas' novel, Camille is not the given name of the heroine; this name was applied to her in derived works in the English-speaking world, presumably because of the similarity in sound to the floral name Camellia (which was coined by  Linnaeus (1753)  after the name of the Czech Jesuit missionary Georg Joseph Kamel). 

The name Camille was given to the heroine as early as in a  silent film of 1915, but it became widely known (and led to the increased popularity of the given name in the United States) with Greta Garbo's Camille of 1936.

Male

 Camille Arambourg (1885–1969), French paleontologist
 Camille Chamoun (1900–1987), former president of Lebanon
 Camille Chat (born 1995), French rugby union player
 Camille Combal (born 1981), French television presenter
 Camille Cordahi (1919–2011), Lebanese footballer
 Camille Bob (1937–2015), American rhythm and blues singer and musician
 Camille Bombois (1883–1970), French painter
 Camille Bulcke (1909–1982), Belgian Jesuit missionary
 Camille van Camp (1834–1891), Belgian painter
 Camille Chevillard (1859–1923), French composer and conductor
 Camille Corot (1796–1875), French painter
 Camille Danguillaume (1919–1950), French cyclist
 Camille Decoppet (1862–1925), Swiss politician
 Camille Delamarre (born 1979), French film editor and film director
 Camille Desmoulins (1760–1794), French journalist and revolutionary
 Camille Doucet (1812–1895), French poet and playwright
 Camille Dreyfus (chemist) (1878–1956), Swiss chemist
 Camille Ferdinand Dreyfus (1849–1915), French politician
 Camille du Locle (1832–1903), French opera librettist
 Camille Erlanger (1863–1919), French opera composer
 Camille Everardi (1824–1899), Belgian opera singer
 Camille Flammarion (1842–1925), French astronomer and author
 Camille Flers (1802–1868), French painter
 Camille Gira (1958–2018), Luxembourgian politician
 Camille Graeser (1892–1980), Swiss painter
 Camille Guérin (1872–1961), French scientist
 Camille Gutt (1884–1971), Belgian economist, politician, and industrialist
 Camille Henry (1933–1997), Canadian ice hockey player
 Camille Hilaire (1916–2004), French painter
 Camille Huard (born 1951), French-Canadian boxer
 Camille Huysmans (1871–1968), Belgian politician
 Camille Jenatzy (1868–1913), Belgian racing driver
 Camille Jordan (1838–1922), French mathematician
 Camille Jordan (politician) (1771–1821), French politician
 Camille Jullian (1859–1933), French historian
 Camille Lacourt (born 1985), French swimmer
 Camille Lefèvre (1853–1933), French sculptor
 Camille Laurin (1922–1999), Canadian psychiatrist and politician
 Camille Lemonnier (1844–1913), Belgian writer
 Camille le Tellier de Louvois (1675–1718), French clergyman
 Camille Libar (1917–1991), Luxembourgian footballer
 Camille Lopez (born 1989), French rugby union player
 Camille Malfroy (1839–1897), New Zealand engineer and politician
 Camille Mandrillon (1891–1969), French biathlete
 Camille Matignon (1867–1934), French chemist
 Camille Mauclair (1872–1945), French writer
 Camille Montagne (1784–1866), French botanist
 Camille Ournac (1845–1925), French politician
 Camille Pelletan (1846–1915), French politician and journalist
 Camille Pissarro (1830–1903), French-Danish impressionist painter
 Camille Pleyel (1788–1855), French musician
 Camille Roqueplan, French painter
 Camille Rousset (1821–1892), French historian
 Camille Saint-Saëns (1835–1921), French composer
 Camille Sée (1847–1919), French politician
 Camille Silvy (1834–1910), French photographer
 Camille Solon (1877–1960), British muralist and ceramist of French descent
 Camille Teisseire (1764–1842), French politician and businessman
 Camille Thériault (born 1955), Canadian politician
 Camille Tissot (1868–1917), French physicist
 Camille Alphonse Trézel (1780–1860), French general

Female

 Camille Anderson (born 1978), an American actress and model
 Camille Babut du Marès, Belgian violinist
 Camille Bonora (born 1956), a former Muppet performer
 Camille Catala (born 1991), a French football player
 Camille Cheng (born 1993), Hong Kong competitive swimmer
 Camille Claudel (1864–1943), a French female sculptor
 Camille Cosby (born 1944), an American philanthropist 
 Camille Coduri (born 1965), a British actress
 Camille Cottin (born 1978), a French actress and comedian
 Camille Dalmais (born 1978), a French singer and musician, better known as Camille
 Camille De Pazzis (born 1978), a French actress
 Camille Drevet (1881-1969), a French anti-colonialist, feminist, and pacifist activist
 Camille Ford (born 1981), an American television personality, actress and producer
 Camille Froidevaux-Metterie (born 1968), French philosopher, researcher and professor 
 Camille Grammer (born 1968), an American reality television star
 Camille Guaty (born 1976), an American actress
 Camille Herron (born 1981), an American long-distance runner 
 Camille Keaton (born 1947), an American actress
 Camille Kitt (born 1988), an American actress and identical twin sister of Kennerly Kitt
 Camille Kostek (born 1992), American model and actress
 Camille Levin (born 1990), American soccer player
 Camille Munro (born 1991), Miss World Canada winner
 Camille Muffat (1989–2015), French swimmer
 Camille Natta (born 1977), French actress 
 Camille Norment (born 1970), Norwegian-American multimedia artist 
 Camille O'Sullivan (born 1970), a British musician, vocalist and actress
 Camille Paglia (born 1947), an American professor, author and critic
 Camille Pin (born 1981), a French tennis player
 Camille Prats (born 1985), Filipino actress
 Camille Rowe (born 1990), a French model and actress
 Camille Saviola (1950–2021), an Italian-American actress and singer
 Camille Seaman (born 1969), an American photographer 
 Camille Sullivan (born 1975), a Canadian actress 
 Camille Thurman (born 1986), American jazz saxophonist and vocalist
 Camille Vasquez (born 1984), American lawyer

Fictional characters
 Camille Raquin, Thérèse's first husband in Zola's Thérèse Raquin
Camille (1936 film)
 Princess Camille, protagonist of Little Nemo: Adventures in Slumberland
 Camille, the main villainess in Power Rangers Jungle Fury
 Camille Miraflor-Legaspi, main character from a Philippine romantic drama series, Marry Me, Marry You, portrayed by Janine Gutierrez
 Camille Montes, the lead Bond girl in the 2008 James Bond film Quantum of Solace
 Camille, a pseudonym used by Prince during the late 1980s and early 1990s
 Camille Leon, a fictional shapeshifting character from Kim Possible portrayed by Ashley Tisdale
 Camille Saroyan, character of the TV series Bones
 Camille the Wood Elf, character in Troll Tales
 Camille Bordey, a detective sergeant in the BBC series Death In Paradise
 Camille, a main character in the French TV series Les Revenants
 Kamille Bidan, the protagonist of Mobile Suit Zeta Gundam
 Camille Preaker, protagonist of Sharp Objects
 Camille, a fighter style champion in League of Legends
 Camille O'Connell, see List of The Originals characters
 Camille Valentini, an assistant and later junior agent in Call My Agent!
 Camille Wallaby, a character in Alfred Hedgehog

References

French masculine given names
French feminine given names